Valeriu Streleț (born 8 March 1970) is a Moldovan politician who was Prime Minister of Moldova in 2015. He subsequently received a vote of no-confidence on 29 October 2015.

Biography 

He has been a member of the Parliament of Moldova since 2009. He was born on 8 March 1970 in Ţareuca in Soviet Moldavia. Between 1987 and 1993 he majored in history at the State University of Moldova. Between 2002 and 2005 he studied economics at the Academy of Economic Studies of Moldova (ASEM). In 2011, he was elected President of the Liberal Democratic (PLDM) faction in the Parliament.

See also
 Streleț Cabinet

External links 
 Valeriu Streleț at Moldovan Parliament website
  Valeriu Streleț at LDPM website

1970 births
Moldovan MPs 2014–2018
Liberal Democratic Party of Moldova MPs
Living people
Moldovan MPs 2009–2010
Moldova State University alumni
Prime Ministers of Moldova